Buzice is a municipality and village in Strakonice District in the South Bohemian Region of the Czech Republic. It has about 200 inhabitants.

Administrative parts

The village of Václavov is an administrative part of Buzice.

Geography
The western part of the municipality with the Buzice village lies in the Blatná Uplands. The eastern part with Václavov lies in the Benešov Uplands.

The Lomnice River flows through the municipality. The territory is rich in ponds.

History
The first written mention of Buzice is from 1384, when Předota of Buzice (Przyedotha de Buzicz) was documented. The next mention is from 1558, when Buzice was described as a village with a fortress, a mill and inns.

Sights
Buzice Fortress, also called Buzice Castle for its size and massive tower, was founded in the second half of the 14th century. In the mid-16th century, it was abandoned. In the 16th and 17th centuries, its two wings were converted into baroque granaries. Most of the main building with part of the residential wings and the remains of the corner tower have survived from the fortress. The remains of the moat and ramparts are well preserved in the southeastern part.

The Chapel of Saint Wenceslaus in the centre of Buzice was built in the early Baroque style in 1810.

References

External links

Villages in Strakonice District